Eduard Cornel Stăncioiu (born 3 March 1981) is a Romanian former professional footballer who played as a goalkeeper for Sportul Studențesc, CFR Cluj, ASA 2013 Târgu Mureș, FCSB and Universitatea Craiova.

Club career
Stăncioiu began his career at Sportul Studenţesc, where he played for 8 years. During the summer of 2006 he moved to CFR Cluj as a free agent.

Stăncioiu accomplished a feat when he conceded no goals between rounds 26 and 30 of the Romanian Liga 1 2004–2005 season. He managed to keep his goal untouched for a total of 457 minutes.

On 15 June 2018, Stăncioiu left FCSB after 2 years with the club.

International career
Stăncioiu played his only game for the Romania national team on 31 May 2008, in a friendly game against Montenegro.

Career statistics

Club

Statistics accurate as of match played 4 March 2017

Honours

Club
CFR Cluj
Liga I: 2007–08, 2009–10, 2011–12
Cupa României: 2007–08, 2008–09, 2009–10
Supercupa României: 2009, 2010

ASA Târgu Mureș
Supercupa României: 2015

References

External links
 
 
 
 

1981 births
Living people
Romanian footballers
Association football goalkeepers
FC Sportul Studențesc București players
Liga I players
CFR Cluj players
ASA 2013 Târgu Mureș players
FC Steaua București players
CS Universitatea Craiova players
Romania international footballers
UEFA Euro 2008 players